Ceyla Pazarbasioglu is a Turkish economist. As of January 2010 she was an assistant director of the International Monetary Fund's (IMF) Monetary and Capital Markets department and was in charge of financial supervision. In 2012 she became deputy director in the same department.

Biography
Pazarbasioglu has B.S. in economics from Boğaziçi University in Istanbul and a Ph.D. in economics from Georgetown University.

From 1992 and 1998, Pazarbasioglu was an economist at the International Monetary Fund (IMF), providing technical assistance to the Czech Republic, Poland, Turkey, Ghana, Korea, Thailand, Russia, and some of the component states of the CIS.  After leaving the IMF, she was Chief Economist at ABN AMRO UK until 2001.

From July 2001 to June 2003, Pazarbasioglu was vice president of the Banking Regulatory and Supervisory Agency of Turkey.

2008-2009 IMF Ukraine mission
From October 2008 till December 2009 Pazarbasioglu was the Chief of the International Montetary Fund's mission to Ukraine. In December 2009 she was replaced by Athanasios Arvanitis. The IMF stressed that the reshuffle was not linked to developments in Ukraine.

As a result of the 2008–2009 Ukrainian financial crisis the IMF approved a $16.4bn loan to Ukraine to bolster its economy in November 2008. As Chief of the IMF Ukraine mission, Pazarbasioglu warned Ukraine in October 2009 that increases in government spending risked future IMF aid. Despite this warnings Ukrainian President Yushchenko approved an increase in social spending in November 2009 that (according to annalists) will highly increase the government deficit, Prime Minister Yulia Tymoshenko was against this law. Annalists saw Yushchenko's move as part of the 2010 Ukrainian presidential election campaign and as part of the long-lasting political struggle between him and Tymoshenko. Increasing social spending has been a major vote-winner in previous Ukrainian elections. The law was submitted by the Bloc of Lytvyn and supported by the Party of Regions of fellow presidential candidate Viktor Yanukovych.

References

External links
IMF Mission Chief for Ukraine Comments on $16.5 Loan Package for Kyiv – Voice of America interview (November 13, 2008)
IMF Urges Ukraine To Stick With Recovery Policies – International Monetary Fund interview (November 4, 2009)

Living people
Turkish economists
International Monetary Fund people
Year of birth missing (living people)
Turkish officials of the United Nations